Nossendorf is a municipality in the Mecklenburgische Seenplatte district, in Mecklenburg-Vorpommern, Germany.

The municipality of Nossendorf is built up with five villages.
 Annenhof
 Medrow
 Nossendorf (central of municipality)
 Toitz
 Volksdorf

References